The Eight Gates of Seoul are eight historical gates that were located in the Fortress Wall of Seoul, South Korea, which surrounded the city in the Joseon Dynasty. Six of these gates exist today (2018). All eight gates were originally built between 1396 and 1398.

Introduction

The Eight Gates were based roughly in the four cardinal and four intermediate directions of the compass. Of the eight gates, the North, South, East, and West were known as the “Four Great Gates” (사대문), while the Northwest, Northeast, Southeast, and Southwest gates were known as the “Four Small Gates” (사소문).

Of the eight gates, two (West and Southwest) no longer exist. Memorials are currently placed roughly where the West and Southwest gates once stood (July 2012). There has been discussion and announcements about rebuilding the West Gate, but no construction has yet been undertaken (as of July 2012) for this gate.

On February 10, 2008, the South Gate was severely damaged in a fire set by an arsonist. The gate was rebuilt over five years, and reopened to the public on May 4, 2013. This gate has the designation of National Treasure No. 1 of South Korea. Of the eight gates, the South and East gates are the largest, and both are located in busy market areas (Namdaemun Market and Dongdaemun Market, respectively).

Besides these eight cardinal gates, many other gates with important histories exist in Seoul, such as Gwanghwamun, the main gate of Gyeongbokgung Palace; Daehanmun, the main gate of Deoksugung Palace; Dongnimmun, also known as Independence Gate; and the remnants of Yeongeunmun, located next to Dongnimmun in Seoul's Seodaemun Independence Park.

Names of the Gates

The eight gates have had various names over the centuries, and may still be referenced by different names. The charts below give the most common names for the gates. Official names and spellings are taken from signage currently found at and on the gates themselves. Note that Hanja is read right-to-left at times, and left-to right at other times. Thus, the character for "gate" (mun, 門) may appear either on the left or right side of actual signboards.

The Four Great Gates

The Four Small Gates

Images of the Gates

See also 
 List of gates in Korea

Notes

Citations

References
Heunginjimun: https://web.archive.org/web/20120611045420/http://www.exploringkorea.com/heunginjimun-gate/ Retrieved 2012.06-16.
Sukjeongmun: http://english.visitkorea.or.kr/enu/SI/SI_EN_3_1_1_1.jsp?cid=264623 Retrieved 2012-06-16.
Sungnyemun (South gate): http://english.visitkorea.or.kr/enu/SI/SI_EN_3_1_1_1.jsp?cid=264257  Retrieved 2012-06-16.
Changuimun: http://english.visitkorea.or.kr/enu/SI/SI_EN_3_1_1_1.jsp?cid=1035096  Retrieved 2012-06-16.
Hyehwamun: http://english.visitkorea.or.kr/enu/SI/SI_EN_3_1_1_1.jsp?cid=1061567  Retrieved 2012-06-16.
Gwanghuimun: https://web.archive.org/web/20120611045410/http://www.exploringkorea.com/gwanghuimun-gate/ Retrieved 2012-06-16.
Donuimun: http://english.chosun.com/site/data/html_dir/2009/10/22/2009102200725.html Retrieved 2012-06-16.
Translations: http://www.koreaaward.com/kor/index.php?mid=news_today&document_srl=5616 Retrieved 2012.06.16.

Buildings and structures completed in 1398
Gates in Korea
Gates in South Korea
Buildings and structures in Seoul
Tourist attractions in Seoul
History of Seoul